Rudolf Allers (13 January 1883, Vienna, Austria-Hungary – 14 December 1963, Hyattsville, Maryland, USA) was an Austrian psychiatrist who was a member of the first group of the founder of psychoanalysis, Sigmund Freud.

Life and career
Rudolf Allers was born to doctor Mark Abeles (1837–1894, originally of Jewish extraction) and Auguste Grailich (1858–1916, daughter of Wilhelm Josef Grailich and Carolina Augusta von Ettingshausen). In 1908, he married Carola Meitner (a sister of Lise Meitner).

Allers was the only Catholic to join the first group of the founder of psychoanalysis Sigmund Freud. Together with Alfred Adler, he later distanced himself from psychoanalysis as understood by Freud and his followers. He was later detached from the group of Adler in 1927. He taught at the University of Vienna (1919).

Allers was master of Viktor Frankl in 1925–1930, mentor of Hans Urs von Balthasar and friend of Saint Edith Stein. Both von Balthasar and Stein lived for several months in Allers' home in Vienna in 1931.

He studied the preventive method of St. John Bosco and his pedagogical applications, and at the invitation of Father Agostino Gemelli, was in Italy to study the philosophy of St. Thomas Aquinas at the Catholic University of Milan and graduated in Philosophy in 1934.

With the annexation of Austria to the Third Reich, Allers emigrated to the United States, where he taught at the Catholic University of America in Washington D.C. (1938 - 1948), then as professor of philosophy at Georgetown University from 1948 until his death in 1963. Allers is buried in St. Mary's Cemetery in Washington, D.C.

He was a Guggenheim Fellow in 1958.

Books 

Work and Play. Collected Papers on the Philosophy of Psychology (1938-1963). Edited by Alexander Batthyány, Jorge Olaechea Catter, Andrew Tallon. Marquette University Press, 2009.

Self Improvement. Benziger Brothers, Inc., 1939. Republished by Kessinger Publishing, New York, 2010.

The Improvement of the Self. Cluny Media LLC, 2019. Republication of Self Improvement published by Benziger Brothers in 1939.

What's Wrong With Freud? A Critical Study of Freudian Psychoanalysis. Roman Catholic Books, US., 1941

The Successful Error: A Critique of Freudian Psychoanalysis. Sheed & Ward Inc, 1940. Republished by Cluny Media LLC, 2019

Forming Character in Adolescents. 1940, Reprinted by Roman Catholic Books in 2006.

Sex Psychology. Published by Roman Catholic Books.

Über Schadelschusse: Probleme Der Klinik und Der Fursorge

In Louis Jugnet : Un psychiatre-philosophe, Rudolf Allers ou l’Anti-Freud, Paris, Cèdre, 1950. Rudolf Allers o el Anti-Freud, Madrid : Speiro, 1974. Puis éd. ESR, 2002, puis éd. de Chiré, 2021.

External links 
 Birth record: https://data.matricula-online.eu/de/oesterreich/wien/09-votivkirche/01-02/?pg=6
 https://discovery.nationalarchives.gov.uk/details/r/c5227692-16d0-43f4-aedc-618c097f6fe8
 https://www.jstor.org/stable/j.ctt1n2txnx.14 
 https://www.jstor.org/stable/community.31025345 
 In Spanish: http://es.catholic.net/op/articulos/9115/cat/432/rudolf-allers-psicologo-catolico.html#modal
 In Italian: http://psicologiacattolicesimo.blogspot.com/2014/04/la-conoscenza-intellettiva-dei.html#more

References 

Austrian psychiatrists
1883 births
1963 deaths
19th-century Australian medical doctors
Austrian Roman Catholics
Academic staff of the University of Vienna
Catholic University of America faculty
Georgetown University faculty
Presidents of the Metaphysical Society of America